The 101st Troop Command (101st TC) is a troop command of the Puerto Rico Army National Guard. The command provides command and control headquarters, and logistical and administrative support to other units of the Puerto Rico Army National Guard that are not structured under another formation headquarters. It also provides administrative support to units from other formations within Puerto Rico that are stationed a long way from their respective higher headquarters.  Because of this, the command's units, formation, and structure tends to be inconsistent as it changes periodically from time to time as the National Guard or the United States Army needs.

During World War II and on up to the time of the Korean War, the US Army was racially segregated. The 295th, 296th, and 65th Infantry regiments were all formations consisting mostly of Puerto Rican enlisted men and National Guardsmen.

The shoulder sleeve insignia was authorized on 16 June 1964. The colors blue and white are used for Infantry units in the US Army. The blue area and white wavy base refer to the Caribbean and the white disc to the Island of Puerto Rico, the white disc also simulating a pearl, Puerto Rico being known as the "Pearl of the Antilles." The furison, a steel device for striking against flint to create a fire, is an ancient heraldic symbol and simulates a battle sight on a rifle. Furisons also form links in the collar of the Order of the Golden Fleece, the foremost Spanish order of chivalry, and refer to the discovery and settlement of Puerto Rico by the Spanish. In this instances, the blue area within the furison refers to San Juan Harbor, the opening between the arms of the furison alluding to "puerto" a harbor and the yellow furison itself to the surrounding land area and natural opulence of the island. The cross on the furison alludes to San Juan and appears on the banner in the crest of the Puerto Rican National Guard. The cross in this instance is red, yellow and red being the colors of Spain.

Structure
 Executive branch of the government of Puerto Rico 
National Guard Bureau 
United States Department of the Army
Puerto Rico Army National Guard
101st Troop Command | Headquarters and Headquarters Detachment (HHD)
1st Battalion, 296th Infantry Regiment | Headquarters and Headquarters Company (HHC) | Mayagüez, Puerto Rico
Alpha Company | San Germán, Puerto Rico
Bravo Company | Utuado, Puerto Rico
Charlie Company | Cabo Rojo, Puerto Rico
Delta Company | Mayagüez, Puerto Rico
3678th Forward Support Company (Attached) | San Germán, Puerto Rico
130th Engineer Battalion | Headquarters and Headquarters Detachment (HHD) | Vega Baja, Puerto Rico
1010th Engineer Company
1011th Engineer Company
1013th Engineer Company 
1014th Engineer Company 
Forward Support Company (FSC)
190th Engineer Battalion| Headquarters and Headquarters Detachment | Caguas, Puerto Rico
215th Engineer Company | Humacao, Puerto Rico
892nd Engineer Company | Juncos, Puerto Rico
1015th Engineer Company | Ceiba, Puerto Rico
1600 EOD Company | Salinas, Puerto Rico
Forward Support Company (FSC)
Company A, 1st Battalion, 111th Aviation Regiment | Puerto Rico Army National Guard Army Aviation Support Facility | San Juan, Puerto Rico
Company D, 1st Battalion, 111th Aviation Regiment | Puerto Rico Army National Guard Army Aviation Support Facility | San Juan, Puerto Rico
113th Mobile Public Affairs Detachment | San Juan, Puerto Rico
248th Army Band | San Juan, Puerto Rico

References

Troop Commands of the United States Army National Guard
Military units and formations in Puerto Rico
Puerto Rico Army National Guard